''Haplochromis'' sp.  'Rusinga oral sheller' is a species of fish in the family Cichlidae. It is endemic to Kenya.

References

Haplochromis
Endemic freshwater fish of Kenya
Undescribed vertebrate species
Taxonomy articles created by Polbot